The 1960 Washington Huskies football team represented the University of Washington during the 1960 NCAA University Division football season.  Home games were played on campus in Seattle at Husky Stadium. Under fourth-year head coach Jim Owens, Washington was 9–1 in the regular season, 4–0 in the Athletic Association of Western Universities (AAWU), defeated top-ranked Minnesota in the Rose Bowl, and outscored its opponents 272 to 107. The Helms Athletic Foundation, which considered bowl games in its ranking, awarded the Huskies the national championship.

The University of Washington officially recognized the 1960 football team as national champions in 2007, wearing throwback uniforms in their game vs. USC. A flag was raised over Husky Stadium honoring the team as national champions.

Season
Led on the field by senior quarterback Bob Schloredt, an All-American the previous year, the Huskies started the season ranked third. Schloredt broke his collarbone in the fifth game, against UCLA, and did not play again in the regular season. Bob Hivner took over as quarterback and won the game plus the next five.

A one-point loss on a last-minute field goal by Orange Bowl-bound Navy two weeks earlier in Seattle was the season's only  The Huskies returned to the Rose Bowl to meet the top-ranked Minnesota Golden Gophers of the Big Ten Conference on January 2. A  underdog,  Washington upset Minnesota  for consecutive Rose Bowl  Schloredt returned at quarterback and was the player of the game for a second straight 

The final rankings in this era were released at the end of the regular season (in late November), prior to the bowl games. Washington was ranked fifth and sixth in the respective polls.

Schedule

All-Coast

Professional football draft selections
Six University of Washington Huskies were selected in the 1961 NFL Draft, which lasted 20 rounds with 280 selections. Four Huskies were selected in the 1961 AFL Draft, which lasted 30 rounds with 240 selections; three of the four were also selected in the NFL draft.

References

External links
 Game program: Washington vs. Washington State at Spokane – November 19, 1960

Washington
Washington Huskies football seasons
College football national champions
Pac-12 Conference football champion seasons
Rose Bowl champion seasons
Washington Huskies football